Mob Figaz is a Bay Area hip hop group formed by C-Bo in 1997. The members consist of Husalah, Rydah J. Klyde, and The Jacka from Pittsburg; Fed-X from Richmond; and AP.9 from Oakland, California.

Their first album, C-Bo's Mob Figaz, was a minor success, reaching #63 on Billboard'''s Top R&B Albums chart. On February 2, 2015, Mob Figaz member The Jacka was fatally shot by an unidentified gunman in Oakland.

Discography

Studio albums
 1999: C-Bo's Mob FigazCompilations
 2003: Mob Figaz 2005: The Best of The Mob Figaz Vol. 1 2007: AP.9 Presents: The Life and Times Of the Mob Figaz 2008: The Best of The Mob Figaz Vol. 2Alumni collaborations
 2002: Camp Mob Figaz: The Street Soundtrack (with various)
 2005: 17708 (MOB) (with AP.9 & Fed-X)
 2005: 3 da Hard Way (with Husalah, The Jacka & Marvaless)
 2006: Mob Trial (with AP.9, The Jacka & Husalah)
 2006: Shower Posse (with Husalah & The Jacka)
 2007: Money Over Bitches (with Rydah J. Klyde & Fed-X)
 2007: Mob Trial 2 (with Fed-X, The Jacka & Rydah J. Klyde)
 2008: Mob Trial 3: The Verdict'' (with The Jacka, AP.9 & Fed-X)  U.S. R&B #91

Guest appearances

References 

Hip hop groups from California
Musical groups established in 1997
Gangsta rap groups
Musical groups from the San Francisco Bay Area